"Patron Tequila" is a song by the Paradiso Girls featuring rappers Lil Jon and Eve, intended to appear on their unreleased debut studio album, Crazy Horse. The song was released on April 14, 2009. The Remixes and The Remixes Part 2 were released to further promote the song.

Background and history
The song was written and produced by Keri Hilson, Lil Jon and T-Pain for Hilson's debut studio album In a Perfect World.... However, at the last minute before her album's turn in date, the song was given to the Paradiso Girls. The group recorded the song and made several alterations. Lil Jon's verse was omitted whilst T-Pain was replaced with US rapper Eve.

The song was released in the US on April 14, 2009 as a CD Single and digital download, along with a release in Canada. The girls promoted the song throughout October 2009 in Canada.

Reception
The song was given mainly positive reviews. Many online sites created a "Who Did It Better?" poll, comparing the Paradiso version to the Hilson version. The song was named MuuMuse's "Summer Jam of 2009".

Music video
The music video, directed by Ray Kay, was shot over a three-day process in May 2009. It opens with a man purchasing Dr. Dre Beats headphones from a Best Buy store after hearing the beat to Patron Tequila through them. Each member of the band is featured in a different location, flirting with the man: Aria Crescendo on a bus, Chelsea filling her car with gas, Kelly in the gas station shop, Lauren paying at the checkout and Shar sitting at the bus stop. The girls are also in the club where Eve raps along with Lil Jon. They also dance in front of a white backdrop. Clips are interspersed of the man dreaming about the girls being in the club but coming back to reality every now and again. The video premiered on Yahoo on June 15, 2009.

There is an alternative uncensored version of the video containing new scenes and the explicit version of the song.

Track listings
Digital download
 "Patron Tequila"

Patron Tequila Remixes Part I
 "Patron Tequila (Dave Audé Club Remix) (featuring Lil Jon) — 07:48
 "Patron Tequila (DJ Dan Club Remix) (featuring Lil Jon) — 05:19

Patron Tequila Remixes Part II
 "Patron Tequila (This/Is Remix)" (featuring Lil Jon) — 04:19
 "Patron Tequila (StoneBridge Remix)" (featuring Lil Jon) — 06:45

Vanguards Remix Single
 "Patron Tequila" (Vanguards Remix) (featuring Pitbull & Lil Jon)

Chart performance

Release history

References

2008 songs
2009 debut singles
Lil Jon songs
Eve (rapper) songs
Music videos directed by Ray Kay
Songs written by Ester Dean
Songs written by Keri Hilson
Song recordings produced by Polow da Don
Songs written by Polow da Don
Interscope Records singles
Songs about alcohol
Crunk songs